Cathrine "Cathy" Peattie (born 24 November 1951, Grangemouth, Falkirk) is a Scottish Labour Party politician.

She was the Member of the Scottish Parliament (MSP) for the Falkirk East constituency from the 1999 Scottish Parliament election until the 2011 Scottish Parliament election, when she was defeated by Angus MacDonald of the Scottish National Party (SNP).

Peattie served as chair of the Scottish Labour Party from 2019 to 2020, with her daughter Cara Hilton serving as vice-chair during her time in the office and succeeding her as chair.

References

External links 
 
 Cathy Peattie new site for 2011 election
 News from Cathy Peattie wordpress blog

1951 births
Living people
People from Grangemouth
Labour MSPs
Members of the Scottish Parliament 1999–2003
Members of the Scottish Parliament 2003–2007
Members of the Scottish Parliament 2007–2011
20th-century Scottish women politicians
Female members of the Scottish Parliament